Edward David Hughes  (June 18, 1906June 30, 1963) was a British organic chemist. He was a professor first at University College, Bangor and then at University College in London, eventually rising to the rank of dean at each. He was elected as a Fellow of the Royal Society in 1949.

Hughes studied organic reaction mechanisms and reaction kinetics, including being one of the first chemists to use isotopes to understand them. He collaborated with Christopher Kelk Ingold, leading to development of the eponymous Hughes–Ingold rules and Hughes–Ingold symbols.

References 

Fellows of the Royal Society
20th-century British chemists
Academics of Bangor University
Academics of University College London
Organic chemists